Terizidone is a drug used in the treatment of tuberculosis. Terizidone is mainly used in multi-drug-resistant tuberculosis (MDR-TB) in conjunction with other second-line drugs. It is a derivate of cycloserine and it is bacteriostatic.

References 

Imines
Isoxazolidinones
Anti-tuberculosis drugs